The , or SICPF, is an organization that aims to promote international events and projects and facilitate cultural exchanges in order to revitalize the local economy. Its headquarters is located in Chūō-ku, Sapporo, Hokkaido, Japan.

Basic Information
The SICPF was established in 1991 by the Hokkaido District Transport Bureau and government of Hokkaido under the "3C principle" — Communication, Convention, Citizen — in order to gain the support and participation of local people and institutions.

Major Activities

Promoting international exchange and cooperation in various fields.
Promoting multiculturalism and cross cultural understandings in city planning.
Fostering the development of human resources needed to successfully carry out international exchanges.
Conveying to the world the attractiveness of Sapporo as an international city.
Engaging in other efforts beyond those mentioned above, when considered necessary to attain the Plaza's objectives.

References

External links
 Sapporo International Communication Plaza Foundation Official Website 
 A Guide to Living in Sapporo 

Chūō-ku, Sapporo
Foundations based in Japan